Kevin Alves (born October 19, 1991) is a Brazilian Canadian figure skater and actor. He competed in the free skate at five ISU Championships. He is the first male skater to represent Brazil at an ISU Championship (2008 Four Continents) and the first Brazilian skater to appear in any discipline at the World Junior Championships (2008).

Personal life 
Alves was born on October 19, 1991, in Toronto and raised in Newmarket, Ontario. His mother is from Brazil and his father is from Portugal.

Skating career 
Alves competed up through the junior level in the Canadian domestic competition structure. While he was a young skater, he discussed with his parents switching to compete for Brazil, his mother's country of origin. He switched to Brazil in 2007.

In the 2007–2008 season, Alves competed at the 2008 Four Continents Championships, becoming the first men's single skater to represent Brazil at an ISU Championship, and placed 26th. Later that month, he placed 36th at the 2008 World Junior Championships, and became the first skater to represent Brazil at the event.

In the 2008–2009 season, Alves made his debut on the ISU Junior Grand Prix. He placed 20th at the event in Courchevel, France, and 10th at the event in Cape Town, South Africa. He placed 16th at the 2009 Four Continents Championships and went on the following month to place 37th at the 2009 World Championships, where he became the first men's skater from Brazil to compete at the senior World level.

Acting and modeling 
Alves began modeling at the age of 12. At age 19 he began acting at Armstrong Acting Studios. Since then he has been acting in shows including Warehouse 13 and What's Up Warthogs. He has a role on Degrassi: The Next Generation playing Fab, a love interest to Tristan Milligan. In 2017, he plays newly arrived werewolf Bat in the second season of Shadowhunters. He portrayed Javi in Netflix series Locke & Key. Alves also has a recurring role as Travis in the Showtime drama series Yellowjackets.

Programs

Competitive highlights

Results for Brazil

Results for Canada

References

External links 

 
 
 

1991 births
Living people
Figure skaters from Toronto
Canadian people of Brazilian descent
Canadian people of Portuguese descent
Brazilian people of Portuguese descent
Brazilian male single skaters
Canadian male single skaters
People with acquired Brazilian citizenship
Competitors at the 2011 Winter Universiade